Induce may refer to:

 Induced consumption
 Induced innovation
 Induced character
 Induced coma
 Induced menopause
 Induced metric
 Induced path
 Induced topology
 Induce (musician), American musician

See also
 Inducement (disambiguation)
 Induction (disambiguation)